Microsoft has designed and sold a variety of ergonomic keyboards for computers. The oldest is the Microsoft Natural Keyboard, released in 1994, the company's first computer keyboard. The newest models are the Sculpt Ergonomic Keyboard (2013), the Surface Ergonomic Keyboard (2016), and the  Microsoft Ergonomic Keyboard (2019).

Models

In general, ergonomic keyboards are designed to keep the user's arms and wrists in a near-neutral position, which means the slant angle (the lateral rotation angle for the keys in each half relative to the axis of the home row in a conventional keyboard) is approximately 10 to 12.5°, the slope (the angle of the keytop surfaces starting from the front edge closer to the user towards the top of the keyboard, relative to a horizontal plane) is -7.5°, and the tent or gable angle of each half (the angle of the keytops from the center of the keyboard towards its left and right edges, relative to the horizontal desk surface) is 20 to 30°.

Notes

Natural Keyboard

The first generation of the Microsoft ergonomic keyboards, named the Natural Keyboard, was released in September 1994, designed for Microsoft Windows 95 and Novell Netware. It was designed for Microsoft by Ziba Design with assistance and manufacturing by Key Tronic. The Microswitch division of Honeywell, which was responsible for that company's keyboards and was acquired by Key Tronic in early 1994, is also credited with design input.

The keyboard uses a fixed-split design, with each half of the alphanumeric section separated, laterally rotated, and tilted upwards and down from the center of the keyboard. This key arrangement was ergonomically designed to prevent carpal tunnel syndrome and other repetitive strain injuries associated with typing for long periods of time. Another innovation was the integrated wrist pad helping to ensure correct posture while sitting at the computer and further reducing strain on the neck, arms and wrists.

The three Num Lock/Caps Lock/Scroll Lock status lights are arranged vertically between the two halves of the alphanumeric section.

Although it was not the first ergonomic keyboard, it was the first widely available sub-$100 offering. The keyboard gained popularity quickly, exceeding Microsoft's forecast of 100,000 units sold by the end of 1994. Microsoft soon asked Key Tronic to ramp up production to 100,000 per month in 1995, and the Natural Keyboard sold over 600,000 per month at its peak. Over 3 million units had been sold by February 1998, when its successor, the Natural Keyboard Elite, was introduced.

As with most Microsoft keyboards, software (Microsoft IntelliType) is bundled with the keyboard for both Mac OS X and Windows, allowing users to customize the function keys and modify keys fairly extensively.

Natural Keyboard Elite

The Microsoft Natural Keyboard has had several upgrades and refreshes since its introduction. Like the original Natural Keyboard, the Elite was manufactured by Key Tronic, who also assisted in its development.

The Elite features a nonstandard layout of the six-key navigation/edit key cluster normally found above the cursor keys (/, /, and /). Another common criticism of the Elite is that the arrow keys' inverted-T layout has been changed into a cross-like layout, with left/right arrows keys side by side and up/down keys bracketing them from above and below, increasing the distance between the vertical keys. Another significant change was the keyboard's adjustable feet. While the original Microsoft Natural Keyboard had feet in the front to generate reverse tilt, the Elite and its successors have their feet in the back. The Natural Keyboard Elite was manufactured in at least two different color schemes; white with black lettering and black with white lettering.

Natural Keyboard Pro

The Natural Keyboard Pro restored the standard inverted-T layout of the cursor keys and six-key nav/edit cluster 2×3 layout, and added a row of program shortcut keys along the top edge of the keyboard (above  —  and the numeric keypad), including multimedia keys and power management keys. Vista and Windows 7 have the ability to customize shortcut key behavior without additional software when using the "internet keyboard" keyboard layout. Some other modern operating systems, such as FreeBSD and most Linux distributions, have comparable configuration options. The Natural Keyboard Pro also included an internal two-port USB hub, which was commonly used to connect other input devices such as a mouse or trackball, but this was dropped in subsequent iterations.

Natural Multimedia Keyboard

The Natural Multimedia Keyboard reworked the row of multimedia buttons and included the controversial F Lock feature, originally debuted in the Microsoft Office Keyboard. On the Natural Multimedia Keyboard, the status indicator lights for Num lock, Scroll lock, and Caps lock were moved from between the banks of alphanumeric keys to a more traditional location above and to the right of the backspace key. The Natural Multimedia Keyboard was manufactured in at least three different color schemes, including white with blue accents, black with silver accents, and white with black accents.

Wireless Optical Desktop Pro
The finish of the mouse and keyboard were changed to black with silver accents, and the indicator lights (Num Lock/Caps Lock/Scroll Lock) were moved to the receiver rather than the keyboard to conserve power.

Natural Ergonomic Keyboard 4000

This keyboard provides a significantly changed ergonomic design, including an integrated leatherette wrist rest, noticeably concave key banks, and a removable front stand to generate negative slope, which helps to straighten the wrist and allows the fingers to drop naturally onto the keys. The multimedia keys have again been redesigned, and the six-key nav/edit cluster has been fixed by returning to the standard 3×2 horizontal rectangular layout. The F Lock key now defaults to "on", providing the original function key features rather than the new "enhanced" functions, and retains its setting across reboots. The 4000 has the indicator lights for Caps lock, etc. moved back to between the banks of keys, although they are now below the space bar, rather than above. The 4000 is also significantly quieter to type on, with less of the distinctive "click clack" noise that is common with older keyboards; as it is likely uses cheaper membrane key switches (as opposed to mechanical), which tend to be quieter but have twice as much travel before depression. The space bar, however, has been reported by several reviewers to be unusually noisy and difficult to depress. The 4000 is available in two variants, Business and Retail. The exact differences are not known, although product descriptions imply that the packaging is different, and prices are often slightly higher for the Business edition.

Natural Ergonomic 7000 keyboard

The biggest difference between the 7000 and 4000 keyboards, aside from wireless functionality, is the position of the status lights (Num Lock, Caps Lock, Scroll Lock, and F Lock). On the Natural Ergonomic 4000, these lights are on the wrist rest, centered vertically under the spacebar. In their place, on the Natural Ergonomic 7000 keyboard, resides a single battery indicator light.

The Microsoft Natural Ergonomic Desktop 7000 comes with a USB wireless dongle that connects both the mouse and the keyboard. The attachment to elevate the front of the keyboard is separate in the box. The Natural Ergonomic Desktop 7000 bundle also comes with batteries, a very brief user guide, a disk containing the Microsoft Intellitype and Intellipoint software, and the Natural Wireless Laser Mouse 7000, which uses the same physical design as the Natural Wireless Laser Mouse 6000 with a different radio frequency.

Sculpt ergonomic keyboard

The wireless keyboard uses a scissor-switch mechanism and features a detached number pad. The arrangement of the six-key nav/edit cluster is nonstandard, although the arrow keys are still laid out as an inverted-T. The Sculpt Ergonomic keyboard and mouse connect to the computer wirelessly using a 2.4 GHz radio through a proprietary USB dongle. The receiver and keyboard communicate using 128-bit AES encryption and are permanently paired at the factory. Because of this, the dongle cannot be replaced and must occupy a USB port; this feature has attracted criticism as a Bluetooth connection would free up a USB port and ensure the keyboard could still be used even if the dongle was misplaced. Microsoft state the proprietary wireless connection eliminates any delay in waking the computer. Rather than using feet to elevate the back of the keyboard, the Sculpt Ergonomic keyboard comes with a reverse-tilt riser that snaps on to the bottom front edge of the keyboard using magnets.

During development, the Sculpt keyboard was codenamed "Manta Ray" for its resemblance to the animal.

Surface Ergonomic Keyboard

The shape of the Surface Ergonomic keyboard is similar to the Sculpt, but the six-key navigation block returns to the standard two-row, three-column arrangement, and the number pad is integrated into right side of the Surface Ergonomic. The Surface is gray and the wrist pad is covered with Alcantara instead of the gloss black finish and vinyl wrist pad of the Sculpt. The Surface has also dropped the option to add the magnetic front riser for negative slope. In addition, the Surface Ergonomic is connected wirelessly over Bluetooth instead of using a proprietary dongle.

One reviewer noted the typing action of the Surface scissor switches was "more satisfying with improved quality" than the Sculpt. Paul Thurrott criticized the Surface Ergonomic keyboard for dropping the front riser option and the increased width, which extends the reach needed to use the mouse for right-handed users.

Microsoft Ergonomic Keyboard 
The Microsoft Ergonomic keyboard was introduced in 2019 and is the successor to the 4000 keyboard.  Like the 4000, it is black, wired, contains three sections (from left to right, alphanumeric, navigation, and numeric keypad), and is not backlit. It loses the zoom toggle, the back/forward button under the spacebar, and the space under the function keys are gone. There is a retail version (LXM-00013) and a business version (LXN-0004) and their differences (aside from the $10 markup on the business version) are currently unknown, though there might only be a UK layout for the business version.

See also 
 Ergonomic keyboard
 List of repetitive strain injury software
 Maltron
 Repetitive strain injury

References

External links 

 Official website
 Technical datasheet for Natural Ergonomic Keyboard (pdf)
 PC World review written by Michael S. Lasky (posted October 25, 2005)
 CNet Asia review written by Felisa Yang (posted September 21, 2005)
 Review written by Xah Lee, 2006 
 Coding horror review written by Jeff Atwood

Computer keyboard models
Microsoft peripherals
Physical ergonomics